Microtomarctus is an extinct monospecific genus of  the Borophaginae subfamily of canids native to North America. Fossil specimens have been found in Nebraska, coastal southeast Texas, California, New Mexico, Nevada and Colorado. It was an intermediate-size canid, and more predaceous than earlier borophagines.

Like some other borophagines it had powerful, bone-crushing jaws and teeth.

References

zipcodezoo.com
www.blm.gov

Borophagines
Prehistoric carnivoran genera
Miocene carnivorans
Miocene mammals of North America